The Hongō campus is one of five campuses of the University of Tokyo. Most of the more specific and advanced undergraduate course are taken here and many research laboratories are located in the Hongō campus area. The Hongo district campus is further divided into three districts: Hongo, Yayoi, and Asano, and they are called Hongo Campus, Yayoi Campus, and Asano Campus respectively.

History

Edo Period 
Most of this area was part of the Kaga Domain. Other clans settled in this regions were: the Toyama and Daishōji (in the University of Tokyo Hospital area) and the Mito and Anjihan (in the Yayoi and Asano campus area). During the Meiji Restoration, most of this land was taken over by the new government and became official land.

University of Tokyo Integration 
In the Meiji era, in 1876, the Tokyo Medical School (the predecessor of Tokyo University School of Medicine) moved to the former site of the clan residence. Then, in 1884 the College of Science, Law, and Literature  relocated here from Kanda. Then, the Judicial Ministry Law School was merged with the College of Law, followed by the College of Arts  and College of Engineering, which also merged. In the 1888 these five departments were integrated into the Tokyo Imperial University school district.

Present 
In 1923, due to the destruction of school facilities in the Great Kanto Earthquake, the transfer of schools to other areas such as Yayoi was considered. Ultimately, the district remained part of the University of Tokyo.

Campuses
Education_in_Japan
University of Tokyo